Choniognathus elegans is a species of crabs in the family Majidae. It is found in South Africa.

References

External links 

 Choniognathus elegans at the World Register of Marine Species (WoRMS)

Majoidea
Crustaceans described in 1921
Fauna of South Africa
Taxa named by Thomas Roscoe Rede Stebbing